The Men's 800m T13 had its Final held on September 15 at 17:34.

Medalists

Results

References
Final

Athletics at the 2008 Summer Paralympics